The Dukedom of Primo de Rivera was a hereditary title in the Spanish nobility. The dukedom was posthumously bestowed on José Antonio Primo de Rivera, founder of the Falangist movement, by General Francisco Franco as head of the Spanish State.

Since José Antonio had no children, the title devolved to his younger brother (Miguel Primo de Rivera y Sáenz de Heredia) and subsequently, for the very same reason, to his nephew Miguel Primo de Rivera y Urquijo.

It was abolished in October 2022, under the purview of the Law of Democratic Memory.

Dukes of Primo de Rivera (1948–2022)
 José Antonio Primo de Rivera y Sáenz de Heredia, 1st Duke of Primo de Rivera (posthumous title, d. 1936)
 Miguel Primo de Rivera y Sáenz de Heredia, 2nd Duke of Primo de Rivera (1948–1964)
 Miguel Primo de Rivera y Urquijo, 3rd Duke of Primo de Rivera (1965–2018)
 Fernando Primo de Rivera y Oriol, 4th Duke of Primo de Rivera  (2019–2022)

References

1948 establishments in Spain
2022 disestablishments in Spain
Dukedoms of Spain
Noble titles created in 1948